Events from the year 1954 in Taiwan, Republic of China. This year is numbered Minguo 43 according to the official Republic of China calendar.

Incumbents
 President – Chiang Kai-shek
 Vice President – Li Zongren, Chen Cheng
 Premier – Chen Cheng, Yu Hung-chun
 Vice Premier – Chang Li-sheng, Huang Shao-ku

Events

March
 22 March – 1954 Republic of China presidential election.

June
23 June – The Republic of China Navy captures the tanker Tuapse from the Soviet Union.

September
 3 September – Start of First Taiwan Strait Crisis.

December
 2 December – Sino-American Mutual Defense Treaty.

Births
 2 January – Hsueh Ling, member of 8th Legislative Yuan
 24 June – Chang San-cheng, Vice Premier (2016)
 26 July – Tsai Chen-nan, actor and singer
 28 July – Chern Jenn-chuan, Minister of Public Construction Commission (2012–2013)
 8 August
 Lin Mun-lee, Director of National Palace Museum (2006–2008)
 Mark Lee Ping-bing, cinematographer, photographer and author
 10 September – Pan An-bang, former singer, TV presenter and actor
 18 September – Liu Wen-hsiung, MLY (1999–2008)
 10 November – Yang Sui-sheng, Magistrate of Lienchiang County (2009–2014)
 15 December – Elaine Jin, actress

References

 
Years of the 20th century in Taiwan